is a Japanese voice actor and singer affiliated with Ken Production. Before his first main role in anime as Toshiki Kai in Cardfight!! Vanguard in 2011, he was mostly known for dubbing foreign dramas.

Filmography

Anime

Film

Original video animation (OVA)

TV Drama

Drama CDs

Video games

Dubbing

Character Song

References

External links
  at Ken Production 

1984 births
Male voice actors from Miyagi Prefecture
Japanese male pop singers
Japanese male video game actors
Japanese male voice actors
Living people
Musicians from Miyagi Prefecture
21st-century Japanese male actors
21st-century Japanese singers
Ken Production voice actors
21st-century Japanese male singers